The  nose is a protuberance in vertebrates which admits and expels air for respiration and contains olfactory receptors for sensing odors.

Nose may also refer to:

Places
 Noše, a settlement in Slovenia
 Nose, Osaka, a town in Japan
 The Nose (El Capitan), a climbing route on El Capitan, California, United States
 The Noses, Big Nose and Little Nose, two steep bluffs on the Mohawk River in Mohawk, New York, United States

Arts, entertainment, and media
 "The Nose" (Akutagawa short story), a 1916 short story by Ryūnosuke Akutagawa
 "The Nose" (Gogol short story), an 1836 short story by Nikolai Gogol
 The Nose (film), a 1977 Soviet TV film
 The Nose (magazine), a 1989–1995 satirical California-based magazine
 The Nose (opera), a 1930 opera by Dmitri Shostakovich based on Gogol's short story

Transportation
 Nose Electric Railway, a subsidiary of Hankyu Railway, a Japanese private railway
 Nose Station, a train station in Tsubata, Ishikawa Prefecture, Japan

People
 Alberto Nosè (born 1979), Italian pianist
 Seiki Nose (born 1952), Japanese judoka
 Nose Yoritsugu (1562–1626), Japanese samurai

Other uses
 Nose, a perfumer
 Nose, a Python unit test framework
 Nose cone or nose, the forward part of an aircraft or spacecraft
 Nose or Cuberdon, a Belgian candy

See also
 Big Nose George (died 1881), an American Old West cattle rustler
 Big Nose Kate (1850–1940), common-law wife of Old West figure Doc Holliday
 Jack McCall (1852 or 1853–1877), aka "Crooked Nose Jack" or "Broken Nose Jack", murderer of Old West legend "Wild Bill" Hickok
 List of noses, locations which are called "nose"
 Noses Creek, Cobb County, Georgia
 
 

Japanese-language surnames